Apollonides Orapius or Horapius was an ancient Greek writer who wrote a work on Egypt, entitled Semenuthi (Σεμενουθί), and seems also to have composed other works on the history and religion of the Egyptians.

References

Ancient Greek writers
Ancient Greek writers known only from secondary sources
Historians of ancient Egypt